NC-17 (No One 17 and Under Admitted) is the highest rating in the Motion Picture Association (MPA) film rating system used for films distributed in the United States. It is assigned to films the MPA believes most parents would consider "patently adult" and not suitable for their children under 18. The rating does not designate films as pornographic or obscene, but simply that the content is only appropriate for adults. The rating may be issued because of violence, sex, drugs, or other elements.  

The NC-17 rating replaced the X rating in 1990 as the X rating was not trademarked by the MPA and had been co-opted by the pornography industry. NC-17 originally stood for "No Children Under 17 Admitted" to combat the misconception that the rating indicated a film was pornographic. In 1995, the MPA reworded the NC-17 rating to "No One 17 and Under Admitted", effectively raising the minimum age for admission from 17 to 18.

This list includes films that received—and released with—an NC-17 rating; films that received it but had it rescinded before release are not included. Rescissions occur most often in the form of re-ratings after edits, re-ratings on appeals, or studios surrendering the rating to leave the film unrated. The list provides the reason the rating was given for some films. The MPA began publishing the reasons for R ratings in 1990, and for all film ratings starting in 2000.

List

See also
 List of Hong Kong Category III films
 List of AO-rated video games
 Extreme cinema

References

NC-17 rated films
Motion Picture Association